Anthony Jules Carp (May 2, 1911 – May 29, 1960) was an American professional basketball player. He played in the National Basketball League in one game for the Chicago Bruins during the 1939–40 season. He also competed in the Amateur Athletic Union, Midwest Basketball Conference, and independent leagues.

References

1911 births
1960 deaths
Amateur Athletic Union men's basketball players
American men's basketball players
Basketball players from Chicago
Chicago Bruins players
Forwards (basketball)